Richard David Preston (born May 29, 1955 in Dayton, Ohio) is a former professional American football player who played running back for six seasons for the Denver Broncos. Dave Preston was drafted by the New England Patriots in the 12th round (333rd overall) of the 1977 NFL Draft, but played his entire six-year career in Denver. Dave started 35 of 76 games, rushing for 1,793 yards and 10 touchdowns on 479 carries. He also caught 161 passes for 1,423 yards and 3 touchdowns. On Special Teams, he returned 18 punts for an 8.5 average and 26 kickoffs for a 23.0 yard average. In 684 touches, Preston fumbled 15 times, recovering 4 of them (1 every 62.2 touches).

"Sarge" earned the Special Team's MVP his Rookie season, and his most productive year came in 1981 when he combined for 1,150 yards rushing and receiving.

During his years with the Broncos Dave was also very active in community activities, serving as Colorado Sports Chairman for Muscular Dystrophy. He was honored by the Boy Scouts of America for his community involvement, and nominated for the Miller High-Life NFL Man-of-the Year award in 1981.  Preston is a Founding Board Member of Rebuilding Together Metro Denver, and he currently serves on the Denver Bronco Alumni Council. He lives in Boulder, Colorado.

1955 births
Living people
Players of American football from Dayton, Ohio
American football running backs
Bowling Green Falcons football players
Denver Broncos players